Rising Sun is a reggae studio album by Augustus Pablo, originally released in 1986 on Greensleeves.

It features Sly Dunbar on drums, Earl "Chinna" Smith on guitar and Dean Frazer on saxophone. Pablo produced the album and played melodica, piano, organ and  synthesizer.

The songs were both recorded at Channel One, Dynamic Sounds and Tuff Gong in Kingston, Jamaica as well as at HC & F in New York City.

The album features Phillip Smart and Scientist as engineers.

Track listing

Side one

 "Dub Wiser"
 "Hop I Land"
 "Rising Sun"
 "Fire Red"
 "Jah Wind"

Side two

 "Pipers of Zion"
 "The Day Before the Riot"
 "African Frontline"
 "Melchesedec (The High Priest)"
 "Sign and Wonders"
 "Kent Road"

Personnel

 Augustus Pablo – keyboards, melodica, piano, organ, synthesizer.
 Sly Dunbar, Noel Alphonso, Basil "Benbow" Creary – drums
 Chris Meredith, Boogsie – bass guitar
 Fazal Prendergast, Earl "Chinna" Smith, Leebert "Gibby" Morrison, Clive Jeffery – guitar
 Menelek, Shacka, Jango – percussion
 Phillip Smart and Scientist – Engineer
 Noel Hearn and Scientist - Mixing Engineer

External links

Augustus Pablo albums
1986 albums
Greensleeves Records albums